Thomas or Tom Turner may refer to:

Politics
Thomas Turner (15th century MP) for Rochester
Thomas Turner (fl.1559), MP for Reading
Thomas Turner (died c. 1586), MP for Bath

Thomas Turner (congressman) (1821–1900), U.S. Congressman from Kentucky, 1877–1881
Thomas G. Turner (1810–1875), governor of Rhode Island
Thomas Frewen Turner, British Member of Parliament for South Leicestershire
Thomas J. Turner (1815–1874), U.S. Representative from Illinois

Sports
Thomas Turner (cricketer) (1865–1936), Australian cricketer
Thomas Turner (footballer) (fl. 1884), Scottish international footballer
Thomas Turner (sport shooter) (born 1972), Australian sport shooter
Tom Turner (catcher) (1916–1986), American Major League catcher, 1940–1944
Tom Turner (first baseman) (1915–2013), American Negro league baseball player

Others
Thomas Turner (dean of Canterbury) (1591–1672), Anglican dean
Thomas Turner (diarist) (1729–1793), English diarist
Thomas Turner (metallurgist) (1861–1951), University of Birmingham
Thomas Turner (president) (1645–1714), Anglican clergyman and academic
Thomas Turner (potter) (1749–1809), English potter
Thomas Turner (surgeon) (1793–1873), English founder of a medical school in Manchester
Thomas Turner (microbiologist) (1902–2002), Dean of Johns Hopkins Medical School, 1957–1968
Thomas C. Turner (1882–1931), US Marine Corps colonel
Thomas Hudson Turner (1815–1852), archaeologist and architectural historian
T. M. Turner (Thomas Memory Turner, 1847–1917), American musician
Thomas Price Turner (c. 1790–1868), professor of music at Exeter Cathedral, first cousin of J. M. W. Turner and one of his heirs
Thomas R. Turner II (born 1955), U.S. Army general
Thomas Wyatt Turner (1877–1978), civil rights activist and biologist
Tom Turner (born 1946), English landscape artist and author

See also
Tommy Turner (disambiguation)